Clergeau is a surname. Notable people with the surname include: 

 Marie-Françoise Clergeau (born 1948), French politician
 Olivier Clergeau (born 1969), French modern pentathlete

See also
 Clergoux

French-language surnames